USS La Moure County (LST-1194) was the sixteenth of twenty  of the United States Navy (USN) which replaced the traditional bow door-design tank landing ships (LSTs). The second vessel named after a county in North Dakota, the LST was constructed by National Steel and Shipbuilding Company of San Diego, California. The vessel was launched and was commissioned into the USN in 1971. La Moure County alternated deployments in the Caribbean Sea with those to the Mediterranean Sea. During the Gulf War, La Moure County transported elements of the 4th Marine Expeditionary Brigade to the Persian Gulf. In 2000, the LST was taking part in a training exercise off Chile when the vessel ran aground. Considered beyond repair, La Moure County was decommissioned that year and towed out to sea in 2001 and sunk as a target ship.

Design and description
However, the traditional bow door form for LSTs would not be capable. Therefore, the designers of the Newport class came up with a design of a traditional ship hull with a  aluminum ramp slung over the bow supported by two derrick arms. This made the Newport class the first to depart from the standard LST design that had been developed in early World War II.

La Moure County was fitted with six Alco 16-645-ES diesel engines turning two shafts, three to each shaft. The ship was also equipped with a bow thruster to allow for better maneuvering near causeways and to hold position while offshore during the unloading of amphibious vehicles.

The Newport class were larger and faster than previous LSTs and were able to transport tanks, heavy vehicles and engineer groups and supplies that were too large for helicopters or smaller landing craft to carry. The LSTs have a ramp forward of the superstructure that connects the lower tank deck with the main deck and a passage large enough to allow access to the parking area amidships. The vessels are also equipped with a stern gate to allow the unloading of amphibious vehicles directly into the water or to unload onto a utility landing craft (LCU) or pier. At either end of the tank deck there is a  turntable that permits vehicles to turn around without having to reverse. The vessels also have davits for four vehicle and personnel landing craft (LCVPs) and could carry four pontoon causeway sections along the sides of the hull.

La Moure County was initially armed with four Mark 33 /50 caliber guns in two twin turrets. The vessel was equipped with two Mk 63 gun control fire systems (GCFS) for the 3-inch guns, but these were removed in 1977–1978. The ship also had SPS-10 surface search radar. Atop the stern gate, the vessels mounted a helicopter deck. They had a maximum complement of 213 including 11 officers.

Construction and career
The LST was ordered as the seventh hull of the third group of the Newport class in Fiscal Year 1967 and a contract was awarded on 15 July 1966. The ship was laid down on 22 May 1970 by the National Steel and Shipbuilding Company in San Diego, California. Named for a county in North Dakota, La Moure County was launched on 13 February 1971 and commissioned into the United States Navy (USN) on 18 December 1971. The ship was assigned to Amphibious Force, Atlantic Fleet and transited the Panama Canal to arrive at the vessel's new home port of Little Creek, Virginia. La Moure County alternated between training operations along the east coast of the United States and the Caribbean Sea and active deployments in the Mediterranean Sea and European waters.

During the Gulf War, La Moure County was part of Amphibious Group 2 (PhibGru2). Tasked with transporting part of the 4th Marine Expeditionary Brigade (4th MEB) via the Mediterranean to the Persian Gulf, the group was divided up into transit groups, with La Moure County joining Transit Group 3. Transit Group 3 departed Morehead City, North Carolina on 21 August 1990 and united with the other transit groups off Masirah Island on 16 September. Transit Group 3 rejoined PhibGru2. PhibGru2 was split back into respective transit groups on 24 March 1991 and Transit Group 2 returned to Little Creek on 17 April after a ceasefire had been declared on 1 April. In 1995 the ship was transferred to the Naval Reserve Force.

Grounding and aftermath
 

The ship was run aground near the coast of Caleta Cifuncho Bay, Chile, in the pre-dawn hours of 12 September 2000 during a routine amphibious training operation with a sister vessel, the Chilean Navy's . A combination of the speed of the ship at impact and the incoming tide resulted in extensive damage to the bow, keel, screws, and rudders. No injuries were suffered by the crew or marines aboard the ship.

Following the grounding, it was found that the captain of the ship had failed to chart his position correctly. This incident led to a complete standdown by all USN vessels to assess their safety and navigation protocols. La Moure Countys grounding, along with several navigational mishaps by other USN vessels led to the USN re-assessing its training in navigation. The USN ordered new simulation training for bridge officers.

La Moure County was deemed damaged beyond repair. The ship was decommissioned and struck from the Naval Vessel Register on 17 November 2000. Having been stripped of all usable material, the damaged hulk of La Moure County was towed out to sea and sunk as a target on 10 July 2001 during UNITAS 2001.

Notes

Citations

References

External links

 

 

Newport-class tank landing ships
Shipwrecks in the Pacific Ocean
Cold War amphibious warfare vessels of the United States
LaMoure County, North Dakota
Ships built in San Diego
1971 ships
Ships sunk as targets
Maritime incidents in 2000
Maritime incidents in 2001